World War I (also known as the First World War and the Great War) was a global military conflict that embroiled most of the world's great powers, assembled in two opposing alliances: the Entente and the Central Powers.  The immediate cause of the war was the June 28, 1914 assassination of Archduke Franz Ferdinand, heir to the Austro-Hungarian throne, by Gavrilo Princip, a Bosnian Serb citizen of Austria-Hungary and member of the Black Hand.  The retaliation by Austria-Hungary against Serbia activated a series of alliances that set off a chain reaction of war declarations. Within a month, much of Europe was in a state of open warfare, resulting in the mobilization of more than 65 million European soldiers, and more than 40 million casualties—including approximately 20 million deaths by the end of the war.

When World War I broke out, the United States maintained a policy of isolationism, avoiding conflict while trying to negotiate peace between the warring nations. However, when a German U-boat sank the British liner Lusitania in 1915, with 128 Americans aboard, U.S. President Woodrow Wilson demanded an end to attacks on passenger ships. Germany complied and Wilson unsuccessfully tried to mediate a settlement. He repeatedly warned that the U.S. would not tolerate unrestricted submarine warfare, in violation of international law.

By the time the United States of America entered the war in 1917—three years after the first shots were fired—several Americans had already gone to fight as pilots by joining the Royal Flying Corps. These pilots reported to Canada, and after flight training were sent to fight as officers in the British military.

The Medal of Honor was created during the American Civil War and is the highest military decoration presented by the United States government to a member of its armed forces. The recipient must have distinguished themselves at the risk of their own life above and beyond the call of duty in action against an enemy of the United States. Due to the nature of this medal, it is commonly presented posthumously.

In all some 121 men received the Medal for their actions in World War I (34 of them posthumously): 92 from the Army, to include 4 from the Air Service, 21 from the Navy (including 10 who received the Medal of non-combat actions), and 8 from the Marine Corps. Among the recipients were Alvin York, who later became the basis for the movie Sergeant York, and Edward Rickenbacker, who became a flying ace. Ralph Talbot of the Marine Corps also became a flying ace and was the first Marine aviator to receive the Medal of Honor.

Since the Medal of Honor was established, 19 recipients have received it twice, of whom 5 received both awards during World War I. These 5 men were all Marines who received both the Army and Navy versions of the Medal of Honor for the same action. This was made possible by the practice of attaching some units of the U.S. Marine Corps, a part of the Department of the Navy, to larger U.S. Army commands, making marines in such units eligible for both Army and Navy decorations. Of the other three marines who earned the Medal of Honor during World War I, two were awarded only the Navy version and one, Fred W. Stockham, received only the Army version. In February 1919, the criteria for the award were amended to state that no person could receive more than one Medal of Honor, thus precluding any future double recipients.

Recipients

See also
 The British Unknown Warrior from World War I
 The American Unknown Soldier from World War I

Footnotes

References

General
 
 
 
 

Inline

World War I
Medal of Honor recipients
Medal of Honor
Medal of Honor